The Mausoleum of Mir Bozorg, or known as Mir Bozorg Marashi Tomb or Mashhad Mir Bozorg, is a complex located at Sabzeh Meydan Square, Amol, Iran.

The Mausoleum was dedicated to the founder of the reign Marashis, Qavam al-Din Marashi, also known as Mir-i Buzurg. In the complex includes a museum and a library.
The original structure was square in shape, and was constructed in the 8th century AH. The tomb tiles are very valuable. It is one of the well-known historical monuments of Mazandaran Province.

Gallery

References

External links

 An introduction to shell structures Book by Michele G. Melaragno
 Iran (Bradt Travel Guides) by Patricia L Baker

Buildings and structures in Mazandaran Province
Tourist attractions in Mazandaran Province
Tourist attractions in Amol
Mausoleums in Iran